The 2000–01 season was Deportivo de La Coruña's 30th season in La Liga, the top division of Spanish football. They also competed in the Copa del Rey, the UEFA Champions League and the Supercopa de España.

Season review

Deportivo, in their third season under coach Javier Irureta, began 2000–01 as defending La Liga champions, having won their first ever top flight title the previous year. This achievement qualified them for the 2000 Supercopa de España, where the faced 1999–2000 Copa del Rey winners Espanyol. After a goalless first leg at Estadi Olímpic de Montjuïc, Depor scored twice in three minutes through Djalminha and Diego Tristán at Estadio Riazor to claim the trophy with a 2–0 win. This was their second Supercopa title, having also won the competition in 1995.

Deportivo's league title also qualified them for the 2000–01 UEFA Champions League, the first time in their history they had entered Europe's elite competition. Their debut began well, as they went undefeated in their six first group stage matches to progress as group winners, ahead of Hamburg, Juventus and Panathinaikos. In the second group stage, they were drawn against Galatasaray, Milan and Paris Saint-Germain, and once again progressed as group winners. They came up against English side Leeds United in the quarter-finals, and gave themselves an uphill task by losing the first leg 3–0 at Elland Road. Despite a 2–0 victory in the second leg, Depor were eliminated 3–2 on aggregate.

The champions couldn't quite match their previous performance in La Liga, although they were still able to finish as runners-up, seven points behind Real Madrid. The real disappointment of the season was saved for the Copa del Rey, where Deportivo were beaten 3–2 by Segunda División side Tenerife in the round of 32, marking their earliest exit from the competition since 1992–93.

Players

Squad

Left club during season

Out on loan for the full season

Transfers

In

Out

Squad stats

Appearances and goals
Last updated on 7 April 2021.

|-
|colspan="14"|Players who have left the club after the start of the season:

|}

Goal scorers

Disciplinary record
Updated on 7 April 2021

Competitions

La Liga

League table

Matches

Copa del Rey

UEFA Champions League

First group stage

Second group stage

Knockout stage

Leeds United won 3–2 on aggregate

Supercopa de España

References

Deportivo de La Coruna
Deportivo de La Coruña seasons